Jennifer E. Rothman (born August 4, 1969) is an American legal scholar.

Rothman was raised in Berkeley, California. After graduating from Princeton University in 1991, she attended the University of Southern California School of Cinematic Arts and worked for Paramount Pictures and Castle Rock Entertainment. After earning a J.D. degree from the UCLA School of Law, Rothman served as a law clerk for Marsha S. Berzon. She taught at Loyola Law School as William G. Coskran Professor of Law. In 2021, Rothman was appointed Nicholas F. Gallicchio Professor of Law at the University of Pennsylvania Law School. She is an elected member of the American Law Institute.

References

Princeton University alumni
Lawyers from Berkeley, California
Living people
21st-century American lawyers
20th-century American lawyers
American women lawyers
UCLA School of Law alumni
University of Pennsylvania Law School faculty
Loyola Law School faculty
USC School of Cinematic Arts alumni
Members of the American Law Institute
1969 births
Castle Rock Entertainment
Paramount Global people